A constitutional referendum was held in Dahomey (now Benin) and French Togoland on 13 October 1946 as part of the wider French constitutional referendum. The new proposed new constitution was rejected by 72.8% of voters, with a turnout of 47.5%. However, the constitution was approved by a majority of voters in the overall results.

Results

References

1946 referendums
October 1946 events in Africa
1946 2
1946 in French Dahomey
1946 2
1946 in French Togoland
1946 2
Constitutional referendums in France